Rafaela Gómez (born 7 April 1997) is an Ecuadorian tennis player.

Playing for Ecuador at the Fed Cup, Gómez has a win–loss record of 9–7.

On the juniors tour, Gómez has a career high ITF junior combined ranking of 219, achieved on 30 March 2015.

ITF junior finals

Singles (2–1)

Doubles (6–8)

References

External links 

 
 
 

1997 births
Living people
Sportspeople from Guayaquil
Ecuadorian female tennis players
20th-century Ecuadorian women
21st-century Ecuadorian women